Joseba is a Basque name meaning Joseph.
It may refer to:

Football players 
 Joseba Etxeberria
 Joseba Llorente Etxarri
 Joseba del Olmo
 Joseba Garmendia
 Joseba Arriaga

Bicycle racers 
 Joseba Zubeldia
 Joseba Albizu
 Joseba Beloki

Writers 
 Bernardo Atxaga (real name: Joseba Irazu Garmendia)
 Joseba Sarrionandia, writer and member of ETA

Other 
 Joseba Elosegi

Basque masculine given names